commonly known as the Zero Nuclear Party in English-speaking countries and as Datsu-Genpatsu (脱原発, roughly "phase down nuclear power") in Japan, was a short-lived Japanese political party that was formed on 22 November 2012. Nagoya mayor Takashi Kawamura and Masahiko Yamada were co-presidents and Shizuka Kamei served as secretary-general. The party was merged with other groups to form the Tomorrow Party of Japan on November 27, 2012.

Presidents of TCJ

See also
Genzei Nippon

References

2012 disestablishments in Japan
2012 establishments in Japan
Centrist parties in Japan
Defunct political parties in Japan
Environmentalism in Japan
Libertarian parties in Japan
Neoliberal parties
Political parties disestablished in 2012
Political parties established in 2012
2012 in Japanese politics